Islington South and Finsbury is a constituency created in 1974 and represented in the House of Commons of the UK Parliament since 2005 by Emily Thornberry of the Labour Party. Thornberry served as Shadow Foreign Secretary from 2016 until 2020 and is currently Shadow Attorney General for England and Wales.

Constituency profile

This densely populated seat covers Barnsbury, part of Highbury, Islington proper, and Clerkenwell and Finsbury adjoining the City. It contains many desirable apartments and townhouses as well as 20th century social housing developments.

The constituency has been described as "the natural habitat of the hypocritical, well-off, ostensibly liberal chattering classes" including higher earners, leaders in the public sector, critics, entertainers, writers and former Prime Ministers Tony Blair and Boris Johnson. Despite this reputation for liberal affluence there is also significant deprivation in the constituency and its neighbour Islington North.

Boundaries 

1974–1983: The London Borough of Islington wards of Barnsbury, Bunhill, Clerkenwell, Pentonville, St Mary, St Peter, and Thornhill.

1983–2010: As above, save that Pentonville was abolished and Canonbury East, Canonbury West, Hillmarton, Holloway were created or added to the seat.

2010–present: The London Borough of Islington wards of Barnsbury, Bunhill, Caledonian, Canonbury, Clerkenwell, Holloway, St Mary's and St Peter's.

The seat covers the southern part of the London Borough of Islington, including Barnsbury, Canonbury, major parts of Holloway, Kings Cross and the former area of the Metropolitan Borough of Finsbury, which includes Bunhill, Pentonville and Clerkenwell.

History 
Islington South and Finsbury was created in 1974 from part of the former Islington South West and Shoreditch and Finsbury constituencies. In 1983, its boundaries changed when the Islington Central constituency was abolished and its area split between Islington South and Finsbury and Islington North.

Islington was an early stronghold for the SDP. All three sitting Labour MPs defected to the party together with a majority of the Borough Council. However, in spite of their less radical position than the Labour Party, they won only one seat to Labour's 59 in the 1982 Islington Council elections and at the 1983 general election, Labour managed to narrowly retain the seat. The new MP, Chris Smith was the first MP to come out as gay and was aligned with the Labour left, and retained the seat with a slight increase in his majority in 1987. By 1992, the post-merged SDP, the Liberal Democrats, had faded locally, and no longer had the former MP as a candidate, and Smith managed to win a majority exceeding 10,000 votes.

The Liberal Democrat revival in local elections in Islington, which saw them take control of the council in 2000, began to cross over to Parliamentary elections in 2001. In 2002, the Liberal Democrats won every council seat in Islington South and Finsbury, and Smith's subsequent retirement and the resultant loss of incumbency made the constituency vulnerable once again in 2005. However Smith's successor, Emily Thornberry, retained the seat with a narrow majority of 484 votes over the Liberal Democrat challenger, Barnsbury councillor Bridget Fox. — the seat therefore became one of the ten most marginal in Britain. However, in the local council elections a year later, Labour made an almost full recovery locally and won a majority of the seats in Islington South and Finsbury, defeating both Bridget Fox and the-then council leader Steve Hitchins. At the 2010 general election, Thornberry increased her majority over Fox. In 2014 the Liberal Democrats lost all their remaining seats on the council. The 2015 general election result made the seat the 93rd safest of Labour's 232 seats by percentage of majority.

Members of Parliament

Election results

Elections in the 2010s

Elections in the 2000s

Elections in the 1990s

Elections in the 1980s

Elections in the 1970s

See also 
 List of parliamentary constituencies in London
 List of parliamentary constituencies in Islington

Notes

References

External links 
Politics Resources (election results from 1922 onwards)
Electoral Calculus (election results from 1955 onwards)

Parliamentary constituencies in London
Constituencies of the Parliament of the United Kingdom established in 1974
Politics of the London Borough of Islington